William Michael Furniss OBE (born 23 March 1954) from Nottinghamshire is the main swimming coach for the British swimming team (and Team GB).

Early life
He was born in Sheffield. He studied Sports Science at university.

Career
He began swimming coaching in the late 1970s. He became a full-time swimming coach in 1980 in Nottingham.

Commonwealth Games
In December 1993 he was named as the head coach for the England team in the 1994 Commonwealth Games in Canada. Barbara Lancaster was the team manager.

European Championships
In March 1995 he was named as head coach for the British team at the 1995 European Aquatics Championships in Austria, organized by LEN (Ligue Européenne de Natation).

British Swimming
In September 1995 he resigned as head coach to the British swimming team, then run by the Amateur Swimming Federation of Great Britain. By 1996 he was again the head coach of the Great Britain Swimming Federation.

Dennis Pursley, an American swimming coach, left his position has head coach of British Swimming after the 2012 Summer Olympics, and he was replaced by Bill Furniss. In October 2015 he was named as the head coach for the Team GB swimming team in the 2016 Olympics.

British Swimming, similar to the Institute of Swimming, is headquartered at Loughborough University.

Furniss was appointed Officer of the Order of the British Empire (OBE) in the 2017 Birthday Honours for services to swimming.

Personal life
He lives in Radcliffe-on-Trent in the Rushcliffe borough of Nottinghamshire. He married Susan in 1978 in Sheffield.

References

External links
 British Swimming
 Swim Skills

1954 births
English swimming coaches
People from Radcliffe-on-Trent
Sportspeople from Nottinghamshire
Sportspeople from Sheffield
Swimming in the United Kingdom
Living people
Officers of the Order of the British Empire